Ryazansky (masculine), Ryazanskaya (feminine), or Ryazanskoye (neuter) is the name of several rural localities in Russia:

Ryazansky, Bolsheglushitsky District, Samara Oblast, a settlement in Bolsheglushitsky District, Samara Oblast
Ryazansky, Stavropolsky District, Samara Oblast, a railway crossing loop in Stavropolsky District, Samara Oblast
Ryazanskoye, a settlement in Gavrilovsky Rural Okrug of Ozyorsky District of Kaliningrad Oblast
Ryazanskaya (rural locality), a stanitsa in Belorechensky District of Krasnodar Krai